Farah "Cocoa" Brown (born October 9, 1972) is an American actress, writer and comedian.

Life and career
Brown was born as Farah Brown in Newport News, Virginia. She  attended and graduated from Virginia Commonwealth University. She also has a Master of Science degree from The University of Phoenix in Secondary Education. Brown has performed in many different comedy stage shows including BET's ComicViewand One Mic Stand and Showtime at the Apollo. She later began appearing on television, playing guest starring roles on ER and Breaking Bad.

In 2011, Brown was cast in the Oprah Winfrey Network comedy series Tyler Perry's For Better or Worse playing the role of Jennifer, Tasha Smith's character best friend. The series ran for six seasons. In 2014, she played the leading role alongside Nia Long, Wendi McLendon-Covey, Zulay Henao and Amy Smart in the comedy-drama film The Single Moms Club. She received positive reviews for her performance. The following year, she appeared in an supporting role in a comedy film Ted 2.

In 2016, Brown played the role of juror Jeanette "Queen B" Harris in the FX drama series The People v. O. J. Simpson: American Crime Story produced by Ryan Murphy. In 2018, she worked again with Ryan Murphy, playing the recurring role of Carla Price opposite Connie Britton and Mariette Hartley in the Fox drama series 9-1-1.

Filmography

Film

Television

References

External links
 

1972 births
Living people
American television actresses
African-American actresses
American film actresses
Actresses from Virginia
Virginia Commonwealth University alumni
21st-century African-American people
21st-century African-American women
20th-century African-American people
20th-century African-American women